The 2020 Indiana Hoosiers football team represented Indiana University in the 2020 NCAA Division I FBS football season. The Hoosiers played their home games at Memorial Stadium in Bloomington, Indiana, and competed as a member of the East Division of the Big Ten Conference. The team was led by fourth-year head coach Tom Allen.

On July 9, 2020, the Big Ten announced that member teams would only play conference games in effort to reduce issues related to the ongoing COVID-19 pandemic. On August 11, the Big Ten canceled the college football season for the fall of 2020 due to the continuing COVID-19 pandemic. This decision was reversed on September 16, with an announcement that each team would play eight games in eight weeks beginning on October 24.

Spring Game
The 2020 Spring Game was scheduled to take place in Bloomington on April 17, 2020 at 7:00 p.m. However, on March 12, 2020, the Big Ten Conference canceled the remainder of all winter and spring sports seasons due to the COVID-19 pandemic.

Previous season

The Hoosiers finished the 2019 season 8–5 overall, 5–4 in Big Ten play to finish in fourth place in the Eastern Division. This would be the Hoosiers' best finish to a season since the 1993 season. The Hoosiers were invited to the Gator Bowl, where they would lose by one point to Tennessee, 22–23.

Offseason

Coaching changes
On December 17, 2019, the Fresno State Bulldogs announced that they had hired Indiana offensive coordinator Kalen DeBoer as their new head coach; DeBoer had served only one year as the Hoosiers' offensive coordinator. On January 10, 2020, Indiana announced it had promoted Nick Sheridan to offensive coordinator and running backs' coach Mike Hart to associate head coach. On January 19, 2020, Allen announced the additions of Jason Jones as safeties coach, Kevin Wright as tight ends coach and promoted former safeties coach, Kasey Teegardin, to special teams coordinator.

Transfers

Outgoing

Notable departures from the 2019 squad included:

Incoming

2020 NFL draft

Hoosiers who were picked in the 2020 NFL Draft:

Preseason

Position key

Recruits
The Hoosiers signed a total of 20 recruits.

Preseason Big Ten poll
Although the Big Ten Conference has not held an official preseason poll since 2010, Cleveland.com has polled sports journalists representing all member schools as a de facto preseason media poll since 2011. For the 2020 poll, Indiana was projected to finish fourth in the East Division.

Schedule
The Hoosiers' 2020 schedule originally consisted of 7 home games and 5 away games; however, the Big Ten moved to a conference-only schedule due to the COVID-19 pandemic. The Hoosiers were also originally scheduled to play three non-conference games, against Western Kentucky and Ball State at home and on the road against UConn.

The Hoosiers were scheduled to host Penn State, Illinois, Michigan, Maryland and Purdue. They were scheduled to travel to Wisconsin, Ohio State, Minnesota, Rutgers and Michigan State.

The season was canceled on August 11, 2020, but announced on September 16 that the decision had been reversed, and that the football season would begin on October 23.

On December 9, Purdue and Indiana announced a mutual one-time cancellation of the Old Oaken Bucket game scheduled for December 12 after team-related activities were paused because of an elevated number of coronavirus cases within both the Boilermakers' and Hoosiers' programs. On December 13, Purdue and Indiana came to a mutual agreement to reschedule the Old Oaken Bucket game for one week later, on December 18; however, on December 15, both teams again mutually agreed to cancel the Friday contest, due to issues remaining on both teams with COVID complications.

Roster

Rankings

(*) Big Ten Conference members were not eligible for the Week 2 of the AP and Coaches Polls and Week 3 of the AP due to not having a scheduled season at the time.

Game summaries

vs No. 8 Penn State

at Rutgers

vs No. 23 Michigan

at Michigan State

at No. 3 Ohio State

vs Maryland

at No. 16 Wisconsin

vs Purdue

vs Ole Miss (Outback Bowl)

Awards and honors

Award watch lists
Listed in the order that they were released

Players / Coaches of the Week

B1G Conference Awards

National Awards

Radio
Radio coverage for all games will be broadcast on IUHoosiers.com All-Access and on various radio frequencies throughout the state. The primary radio announcer is long-time broadcaster Don Fischer with Play-by-Play.

Players drafted into the NFL

References

Indiana
Indiana Hoosiers football seasons
Indiana Hoosiers football